Kordabad (also Romanized as Kordābād; also known as Kordūr) is a village in Gonbar Rural District, in the Central District of Osku County, East Azerbaijan Province, Iran. At the 2006 census, its population was 2,150, in 410 families.

References 

Populated places in Osku County